Internazionale was a Peruvian football club, playing in the city of San Borja, Lima, Peru.

History
The club was 1986 Peruvian Segunda División champion.

The club have played at the highest level of Peruvian football on five occasions, from 1987 Torneo Descentralizado until 1991 Torneo Descentralizado when was relegated.

In the 1992 Segunda División Peruana, the club was relegated to the Copa Perú.

Honours

National
Peruvian Segunda División: 1
Winners (1): 1986

See also
List of football clubs in Peru
Peruvian football league system

External links
 Peru 2nd Division Champions (Lima)
 Peruvian First Division 1987 and 1988

Football clubs in Peru